General Palmer may refer to:

United Kingdom
Anthony Palmer (British Army officer) (born 1949), British Army lieutenant general
Arthur Power Palmer (1840–1904), British Indian Army general
George Palmer (British Army officer) (1857–1932), British Army brigadier general
Henry Spencer Palmer (1838–1893), British Army major general
Michael Palmer (British Army officer) (1928–2017), British Army major general
Patrick Palmer (British Army officer) (1933–1999), British Army general
Sir Roger Palmer, 5th Baronet (1832–1910), British Army lieutenant general

United States
Bruce Palmer Jr. (1913–2000), U.S. Army four-star general
Charles D. Palmer (1902–1999), U.S. Army four-star general
Dave Richard Palmer (born 1934), U.S. Army lieutenant general
Henry Palmer (surgeon) (1827–1895), Brigadier Surgeon of U.S. Volunteers and Surgeon General of Wisconsin
Innis N. Palmer (1824–1900), Union Army brigadier general and brevet major general
John McAuley Palmer (general) (1870–1955), U.S. Army brigadier general
John M. Palmer (politician) (1817–1900), Union Army major general
Joseph Palmer (American Revolutionary War general) (1716–1788), Continental Army brigadier general
Joseph B. Palmer (1825–1890), Confederate States Army general
William Jackson Palmer (1836–1909) U.S. Army brevet brigadier general
Williston B. Palmer (1899–1973), U.S. Army four-star general

See also
Attorney General Palmer (disambiguation)